Moulton is a large village in West Northamptonshire. The population of the civil parish at the 2011 Census was 3,454. 

The villages name origin is uncertain. 'Mula's farm/settlement' or 'mules' farm/settlement'.

Education
There are many pre-school facilities in the village including playgroups and nurseries. Primary education in the village is provided by Moulton Primary School, although it is not uncommon for children to attend other primary schools in the local area, for example Overstone, Pitsford or Parklands primary schools.

Moulton School and Science College is a comprehensive school providing education for 11- to 18-year-olds, not only to those from Moulton but also to students from the surrounding villages.

Moulton is home to Moulton College, an agricultural and trade orientated college.

Church
The Church of England parish church is dedicated to St Peter and St Paul. It is within the Conservative Evangelical tradition of the Church of England, and it has passed resolutions to reject the ordination of women. There has been a small church building in Moulton since the early 7th century, built of wood, but this was burnt down by invading Danes, was rebuilt, but again suffered the same fate.  The invading Normans erected a building of stone, the beginning of today’s building.  During the 19th century, during church renovation, the shaft of a stone Saxon preaching cross was discovered under the floor, which is now displayed in the south aisle. Moulton has a peal of twelve bells, one of three others within Peterborough Diocese, and one of about only one hundred or so in the world.  During the 15th century there were four bells  and in the succeeding centuries more were added, the latest two making up the twelve in 1993. Two of Moulton’s peal, hung in 1934, commemorate William Carey's pastorate and residence in the village 1785-1789.

Notable residents
John Sanderson (1578/9-c.1653) was living at Moulton in 1606/7. He purchased a substantial quantity of land in the parish in 1629 and apparently remained there for much if not all of the rest of his life.

The village was the 18th-century home of William Carey. The church where he ministered, and the cottage in which he lived, are located at the west end of West Street. The village also has links with John Jeyes (of Jeyes Fluid fame) as Holly Lodge is found on the road from Moulton to Boughton (a building associated with the family). Holly Lodge has the 'Implement gate' (c. 1955), which is iconic of the rural beginnings of Moulton.

Amenities
The stone-built Gothic Revival style Methodist Chapel of 1835 with  arched windows is next to the old school of 1878, now used by the Moulton Theatre.

Moulton hosts an annual village festival (held in May) and is home to the Moulton Morris Dancers. The Moulton Village Hall is also home to the Parish Council and also contains a cafe.

The centre of Moulton houses the parish church, a shop and a number of parks, "The Public Gardens", "Busby's Meadow" and "Crow Fields Common" , a nature reserve managed by Moulton Parish Council. The latter being a popular dog-walking route.

The local Co-op store was run by the Moulton Co-operative Society, an independent society and one of Britain's smallest until its merger with Midlands Co-operative Society in 2009.

Moulton is home to a number of pubs including the iconic Cardigan Arms, The Telegraph, The Artichoke, a working men's club. Moulton also contains, on its fringe, the Northampton Fire and Rescue Service Headquarters.

Geology
The geology of Moulton is based on sedimentary rocks known as Oolite. Cornbrash, Inferior and Great Oolite rocks have dictated that the soils of Moulton are predominantly sands and clays, but small quantities of ironstone may be found. This ironstone was used extensively for construction of buildings in and outside of Moulton. Moulton's elevation lies at 400–600 ft above sea level and the nature of the soil means that it is relatively free of flooding and drains well without becoming too dry. The alluvial nature of the soil means that it is fertile and can be used to grow a wide range of plants.

Geography
Moulton has a population of over 3,000. Moulton has been affected by the expansion of Northampton yet retains a village identity. It is thought that the village has its origins in Saxon times, although the main features of the present church are Norman or later. Moulton is a village of narrow winding lanes, lined by stone-built cottages and houses, nowadays with traffic calming and one-way systems. In the area of Moulton Leys in the south, the Kettering Road takes residents from Moulton to Northampton town centre.

The boundaries of Moulton extend from Pitsford reservoir in the north to Moulton Lane in the south. In the east, the A43 (Kettering Road) is the border, with a small quantity of land that adjoins the east side of the A43 near Ashley Lane. The western fringe corresponds with all land east of Spectacle Lane.

The topography of Moulton is generally flat, but the gradient of land runs from a higher southern elevation in towards lower parts, in the village centre, and then elevates again in a northern direction. At the northern boundary the lower elevations of the reservoir are separated from the village by a strip of high ground.

In the village centre, a tributary of the Nene river flows from the east of the village in a westerly direction where it joins the Nene near Chapel Brampton. Medieval fish ponds in the village were fed from this tributary.

Crowfields Meadow is part of Moulton village and boasts a range of wildlife and plants. Boughton Lane Pocket Park on the Southern end of Moulton is another source of animal and plant biodiversity.

The A43 Moulton Bypass provisionally opened on 6 February 2020, removing through traffic from the village.

References

External links

Parish Council
Moulton Focus
Moulton Secondary School
Moulton Primary School
Moulton Magpies
Moulton Parish Church 
Carey Baptist Church, Moulton

Villages in Northamptonshire
West Northamptonshire District
Civil parishes in Northamptonshire